The HVDC Itaipu is a High-voltage direct current overhead line transmission system in  Brazil from the Itaipu hydroelectric power plant to the region of São Paulo. The project consists of two ±600 kV bipoles, each with a rated power of 3150 MW, which transmit power generated at 50 Hz from the Paraguay side of the Itaipu Dam (near Foz do Iguaçu in Paraná) to the Ibiúna converter station  near São Roque, São Paulo. The system was put in service in several steps between 1984 and 1987, and remains among the most important HVDC installations in the world.

When the first bipole was completed in 1985, it became the world's largest HVDC system by both power transmission capacity and voltage, titles which it would hold for 25 years until the completion, in 2010, of the ±800 kV, 6400 MW HVDC link from Xiangjiaba Dam to Shanghai in China.  It also contained important innovations in real-time control systems, being one of the first HVDC schemes to use digital control equipment using microprocessors. Nevertheless it suffered reliability problems in its first few years of operation, with numerous converter transformer failures and one serious converter fire, although reliability is now reported to be much improved.

Technical description
High Voltage Direct Current (HVDC) was chosen both because this technique allows long transmission lines with little loss compared to other systems (like AC), and  also allows interchange of the Paraguayan 50 Hz input and the Brazilian 60 Hz input and user grid. 
Both lines operate at ±600 kV and are built as overhead lines with a length of 818 (North line) and 807 (South line) kilometers. Away from their terminal stations, the two lines are at least 10 km apart to reduce risks. Each one is designed for 3150 MW at ± 600 kV D.C. and 2625 A. The lines are 4 x 689 mm² (about 30 mm ∅) ACSR

The incoming supply is 500 kV AC from the 50 Hz generators at the hydro dam (Foz do Iguaçu).  The outgoing power is 345 and 500 kV, 60 Hz AC into the South/Southeastern grid (Ibiúna, São Paulo). 

The converter equipment, supplied by ABB Group, uses thyristor valves arranged in two, twelve-pulse bridges per pole.

In parallel with the HVDC system, two 765 kV AC lines carry power from the 60 Hz generators on the Brazilian side of the dam to the São Paulo region. At  into the route, at Ivaiporã, there is a branch into 500 kV, 60 Hz AC, delivering into the Southern grid.

Reliability 

In its first few years, the project suffered many failures of converter transformers, with six in the first year of commercial operation and twelve in the first four years.  Modifications had to be made to all of the transformers on the system, and led to markedly improved performance, with no failures in years 4-10.

On 29 May 1989, a complete quadrivalve in converter 5 of the Foz do Iguaçu converter station was destroyed by a fire which started as a result of a water leakage from a cooling pipe.  The affected converter was out of action for 14 months.  Similar incidents on the Rihand–Delhi project in 1990 and the Sylmar Converter Station of the Pacific DC Intertie scheme in 1993 led to CIGRÉ publishing guidelines on the design of thyristor valves in order to reduce fire risks.

Electrodes 

Each bipole can be operated also as monopole and is equipped with a grounding electrode. The electrode lines of both bipoles are installed on wooden poles and consist of 2 x 689 mm2 1272 MCM conductors.

Waypoints

See also

High-voltage direct current
HVDC converter station
HVDC converter
Electrode line
List of HVDC projects

References

Electric power infrastructure in Brazil
HVDC transmission lines
1984 establishments in Brazil
Energy infrastructure completed in 1987